The 1935 Middle Tennessee State Teachers Blue Raiders football team was an American football team that represented Middle Tennessee State Teachers College (now known as Middle Tennessee State University) as a member of the Southern Intercollegiate Athletic Association during the 1935 college football season. In their second season under head coach Johnny Floyd, Middle Tennessee compiled a 8–0 record and finished as SIAA champion. The team's captain was Homer Pittard.

Schedule

References

Middle Tennessee State Teachers
Middle Tennessee Blue Raiders football seasons
College football undefeated seasons
Middle Tennessee State Teachers Blue Raiders football